The Church of Jesus Christ of Latter-day Saints in Norway is a restorationist free church.  There are more than 4,500 members in Norway. A temple to be built in Oslo was announced on April 4, 2021 by church President Russell M. Nelson.

History 

The first Norwegians who joined the Church of Jesus Christ of Latter-day Saints (LDS Church) were emigrants from Norway, living in a colony on the Fox River in Illinois, America. In 1842 George Parker Dykes came to this Norwegian colony as a missionary sent from Nauvoo. In a short time, he established a Norwegian congregation, and soon thereafter brought the message of the restoration to other Norwegian settlements in Iowa and Wisconsin.

Knut Pedersen from Stavanger and Erik Hogan from Telemark were some of the many Norwegian members that migrated west to the Utah Territory after the death of Joseph Smith. They were met in the mountains by a group heading east who had been called to open the Scandinavian Mission: Erastus Snow, the Swede John E. Forsgren, and the Dane Peter O. Hansen.  George P. Dykes joined the group in England, and was particularly helpful because of his knowledge of Norwegian from his time at Fox River.

In the summer of 1850 they came to Copenhagen, which was a headquarters for the Scandinavian Mission until 1950. The Book of Mormon was translated into Danish in 1850 as the first language other than English; this formed a basis for the early missionary work in Norway, as the Bible and the Book of Mormon was used together in preaching.

The first baptism in Norway were in Risør on 26 November 1851, and in 1852 branches were organized in Risør, Brevik and Fredrikstad. Membership grew rapidly after these branches were organized, and new congregations were organized in major cities along the coast over the next 2–3 years.  Controversy arose among Norwegian theologians as to whether Mormons should be viewed as Christians; in November 1853, the Supreme Court of Norway ruled that Norway's Dissenter Law of 1845, which protected the rights of Christian groups outside the established Church of Norway, did not apply to Mormons, and eleven Mormon preachers were jailed. The Mormon community repeatedly petitioned for the law to be changed, finally succeeding in 1882.  The stigma of polygamy was a significant hindrance to proselytizing in Norway, and also meant that those who did convert had an additional incentive to emigrate.

The growth of the church within Norway was historically limited by continuing migration to the United States until after World War II. There was significant growth in the last half of the 20th century. Today there are over 4,500 members of the LDS Church in Norway, and membership is again increasing. A temple to be built in Oslo was announced on April 4, 2021, by church president Russell M. Nelson.

Stakes and congregations

As of February 2023, the following congregations were located in Norway:

Drammen Norway Stake
Arendal Gren (Arendal Branch)
Bergen Menighet (Bergen Ward)
Drammen Menighet (Drammen Ward)
Haugesund Gren (Haugesund Branch)
Kristiansand Menighet (Kristiansand Ward)
Skien Menighet (Skien Ward)
Stavanger Menighet (Stavanger Ward)
Tønsberg Gren (Tønsberg Branch)

Oslo Norway Stake
Fredrikstad Menighet (Fredrikstad Ward)
Hamar Gren (Hamar Branch)
Moss Menighet (Moss Ward)
Oslo Menighet (Oslo Ward)
Romerike Menighet (Romerike Ward)
Sandvika Menighet (Sandvika Ward)
Trondheim Menighet (Trondheim Ward)

Other Congregations

The following congregations are not part of a stake:
Alta-Hammerfest Gren (Alta-Hammerfest Branch)
Bodø Gren (Bodø Branch)
Narvik-Harstad Gren (Narvik-Harstad Branch)
Tromsø Gren (Tromsø Branch)
Congregations not part of a stake are classified as branches, regardless of size.

Missions
Norway Oslo Mission

Temples
LDS Church members in Norway have been served for many years by the temple in Stockholm, Sweden.  On April 4, 2021, during the general conference, church president Russell M. Nelson announced the first temple for Norway, to be built in Oslo. Until it is completed, members will continue to use those in the neighboring countries. Norway's two stakes are both within the Stockholm Sweden Temple district.

See also 
 Christianity in Norway

References

Further reading 
 Glad, Johnnie (2006). The Mission of Mormonism in Norway 1851—1920: A Study and Analysis of the Reception Process, Frankfurt, Peter Lang, 
 Gundersen, Dianna (2001). With Scriptures in their Backpack: American LDS Women Missionaries in Norway, PhD Thesis, University of Oslo
 Haslam, Gerald, M. (1984). Clash of Cultures: The Norwegian Experience with Mormonism, 1842-1920. New York, Peter Lang,  
 Mulder, William (1957/2000). Homeward to Zion. The Mormon Migration from Scandinavia, Minneapolis: University of Minnesota Press

External links 
 
 The Church of Jesus Christ of Latter-day Saints Official site
 Gerald M. Haslam research materials about the Mormon church in Norway, MSS 1998, at the L. Tom Perry Special Collections, Harold B. Lee Library, Brigham Young University

 
Christian denominations in Norway